Langille Peak is a  mountain summit located west of the crest of the Sierra Nevada mountain range, in Fresno County of central California, United States. The approach to this remote peak is made via the John Muir Trail.

History

The peak's name (pronounced "Lan'jill") honors Harold Douglas Langille (1874–1954), forest inspector for the General Land Office, Department of the Interior, who visited Sierra Forest Reserve on an inspection tour in 1904. The name was officially adopted by the USGS at the suggestion of Charles Howard Shinn, head ranger of the forest reserve.

The first ascent of the summit was made in August 1926 by Nathaniel L. Goodrich, Marjory Hurd, and Dean Peabody, Jr. via the West Ridge.

Climbing
Established climbing routes:

 West Ridge –  – First ascent 1926
 East Buttress – class 4-5 – FA 1970
 Southeast Face – class 4 – FA 1971
 Southwest Slope – class 2 – FA 2003

Climate
According to the Köppen climate classification system, Langille Peak is located in an alpine climate zone. Most weather fronts originate in the Pacific Ocean, and travel east toward the Sierra Nevada mountains. As fronts approach, they are forced upward by the peaks, causing them to drop their moisture in the form of rain or snowfall onto the range (orographic lift). Precipitation runoff from this mountain drains into the Middle Fork Kings River.

See also

 List of mountain peaks of California

References

External links

 Weather forecast: Langille Peak

Mountains of Fresno County, California
Mountains of Kings Canyon National Park
North American 3000 m summits
Mountains of Northern California
Sierra Nevada (United States)